Gert van der Merwe was a Paralympic athlete from South Africa who competed mainly in category F37 throwing events.

Gert started competing in the Paralympics in 1996 competing in the discus and shot put, winning gold in the latter.  He also competed in the 2000 Summer Paralympics where he defended his shot put title and also competed in the javelin and as part of the South African 4 × 100 m relay team.

References

Paralympic athletes of South Africa
Athletes (track and field) at the 1996 Summer Paralympics
Athletes (track and field) at the 2000 Summer Paralympics
Paralympic gold medalists for South Africa
Living people
Medalists at the 1996 Summer Paralympics
Medalists at the 2000 Summer Paralympics
Year of birth missing (living people)
Paralympic medalists in athletics (track and field)
South African male shot putters
South African male javelin throwers
South African male sprinters
20th-century South African people
21st-century South African people